"Fingerprint File" is the closing track from the Rolling Stones' 1974 album It's Only Rock 'n Roll. It is one of their first attempts to branch out into dance or electronic music, and the song resembles music by Sly and the Family Stone. Key ingredients of the song are the rhythm guitar played by Mick Jagger, which features heavy phasing due to the use of the MXR Phase 100 effects pedal, and the highly jazz/funk-oriented bass guitar played by Mick Taylor. Keith Richards uses the wah-wah pedal for his guitar part. Bill Wyman is on synthesiser, Charlie Watts on drums, Billy Preston on clavinet, and Nicky Hopkins on piano. Charlie Jolly Kunjappu is featured on the tabla.

The lyrics express frustration over government monitoring and surveillance activity.

A live version is featured on the 1977 live album Love You Live and the 2012 live album L.A. Friday (Live 1975), recorded during the Rolling Stones Tour of the Americas '75.

On most releases of It's Only Rock 'n Roll, "Fingerprint File" is mastered at a faster speed than the original recording. A 2011 Japanese SHM-SACD reissue of the album features a speed-corrected version of the song, running about a half-minute longer than on other releases.

References

The Rolling Stones songs
Songs written by Jagger–Richards
1974 songs
Funk rock songs
Song recordings produced by Jagger–Richards